Zee Bangla Cinema is an Indian Bengali-Language Movie channel owned by Zee Entertainment Enterprises. It was launched on 23 September 2012. It is a sister channel of Bengali-language network Zee Bangla.

On account of Zee Bangla Cinema's 10th anniversary, the channel changed their logo by moving the word 'Cinema' to the top matching with the word 'Bangla' and a new set of graphics were introduced since its logo change on 15 October 2017.

Availability
The channel available across India and other countries through satellite and cable. It is also available through digital and mobile entertainment platform with live on ZEE5.

References

External links
Zee Bangla Cinema Official website on ZEE5

 

2012 establishments in West Bengal
Bengali-language television channels in India
Television channels and stations established in 2012
Movie channels in India
Television stations in Kolkata
Zee Entertainment Enterprises